Oskar Ingemann Øksnes (11 April 1921 – 27 March 1999) was a Norwegian politician for the Labour Party. He was born in Kvam, Nord-Trøndelag. An agronomist by education, Øksnes was state secretary to the Minister of Agriculture from 1964 to 1965, during the Gerhardsen's Fourth Cabinet. He later became Minister of Agriculture in 1976, and served in the post until 1981 in Nordli's Cabinet and Brundtland's First Cabinet.

He was decorated Knight, First Order of the Royal Norwegian Order of St. Olav in 1987.

References

1921 births
1999 deaths
Norwegian state secretaries
Ministers of Agriculture and Food of Norway
Labour Party (Norway) politicians
Politicians from Nord-Trøndelag